"Stranger in Me" is a song by Australian pop group Pseudo Echo. The song was released in November 1984 as the fourth and final single from their debut studio album, Autumnal Park (1984). The song peaked at number 58 on the Australian Kent Music Report in December 1984.

Track listing 
7" (EMI-1390) 
Side A "Stranger in Me" - 4:19
Side B "Turning The Pages" - 4:50

12" (EMI - ED 96)
Side A "Stranger in Me" - 6:04
Side A "Listening" - 5:35
Side B "Stranger in Me" (Instrumental) - 5:33
Side B "Destination Unknown" - 5:48

Charts

References 

1984 songs
1984 singles
Pseudo Echo songs
Song recordings produced by John Punter